The Art of Control is the eighth studio solo album by Peter Frampton and the album was first released in 1982 on A&M Records, his last for the label.

According to Peter Frampton, the record company, A&M forced him to make a commercial, radio-friendly album that he felt didn't sound like a "Peter Frampton album", which has caused him to hate the album.

Japanese reissue
The original mix of the album was reissued in Japan in a miniature replica of the original album artwork. The album was remastered, for this reissue using Direct Stream Digital (DSD) to transfer the digital files and included the bonus tracks added to the Compact disc (CD) release of the album. The release was a limited edition in the SHM-CD format. The reissue included a picture of the original vinyl label.

Super High Material (SHM), is a manufacturing process utilized on some Japanese pre-recorded Compact Discs (SHM-CDs) and super audio compact discs (SHM-SACDs)

Track listing

All songs written by Peter Frampton and Mark Goldenberg.

Side one

Side two

Personnel
 Peter Frampton - lead vocals, lead guitar, bass guitar, keyboards, guitar synthesizer
 Mark Goldenberg - rhythm guitar, keyboards, backing vocals
 John Regan - bass guitar
 Harry Stinson - drums
 Ian Lloyd - backing vocals on "I Read the News", "An Eye for an Eye", "Heart in the Fire" and "Barbara's Vacation"
 Eddie Kramer - backing vocals on "Barbara's Vacation"
 JD Dworkow - backing vocals on "Barbara's Vacation"
Engineering
 Eddie Kramer - engineer, mixer
 Guy Charbonneau - assistant engineer
 Alan Myerson - assistant engineer
 Cliff Bonnell - assistant engineer
 Phil Magnotti - assistant engineer
 Mike Scott - assistant engineer
 Don Wershba - assistant engineer
 George Marino - mastering engineer
 Hitoshi Takiguchi - mastering engineer
Album artwork
 Norman Moore - artwork direction, cover artwork, cover artwork concept, design
 Glenn Wexler - cover artwork photography
 Jeffrey Kent Ayeroff - artwork direction
 Shinjiro Kawashima - artwork research
 Chihiro Nozaki - artwork coordinator

Sales chart performance
Album

References

1982 albums
Peter Frampton albums
Albums produced by Eddie Kramer
Albums produced by Peter Frampton
A&M Records albums